The Ambitieux was a First Rank three-decker ship of the line of the French Royal Navy. She was armed with 92 guns, comprising twenty-eight 36-pounder guns on the lower deck, twenty-eight 18-pounder guns on the middle deck, and twenty-six 8-pounder guns on the upper deck, with ten 6-pounder guns on the quarterdeck.

Designed and built by Honoré Malet, she was begun at Rochefort Dockyard in July 1691 and launched on December of the same year. On completion in April 1692, she joined the Ponant fleet and took part in the Battle of Barfleur on 29 May 1692. Following that action, she was destroyed by an English attack at La Hougue in June 1692. A replacement ship of the same name was promptly built at Rochefort.

References

Nomenclature des Vaisseaux du Roi-Soleil de 1661 a 1715. Alain Demerliac (Editions Omega, Nice – various dates).
The Sun King's Vessels (2015) - Jean-Claude Lemineur; English translation by François Fougerat. Editions ANCRE.  
Winfield, Rif and Roberts, Stephen (2017) French Warships in the Age of Sail 1626-1786: Design, Construction, Careers and Fates. Seaforth Publishing. . 

Ships of the line of the French Navy
1690s ships
Ships built in France